Sushil Ramjoorawon, The Right Honorable Lady Ramgoolam (2 October 1922 – 5 January 1984; commonly known as Lady Sushil Ramgoolam) was the wife of the late Sir Seewoosagur Ramgoolam, father of the nation, leader of the Labour Party from 1959 to 1982, ex-Prime Minister of Mauritius (1968-1982) and ex-Governor General of Mauritius (1983-1985). She was First Lady of Mauritius while her husband was in office of Governor General and Prime Minister of Mauritius from 1968 to 1982. Her son Navin Ramgoolam has also been Prime Minister of Mauritius (1995-2000, 2005-2014).

Personal life
Sushil Ramgoolam was the eldest daughter of Thacoordial and Anjanee Ramjoorawon. She had five sisters and two brothers. In 1939, at the age of 17, she married Seewoosagur Ramgoolam. They had a daughter, Sunita (now Mrs. Joypaul) and a son, Navin(chandra), who has been elected Prime Minister of Mauritius three times. She was married to Sir Seewoosagur Ramgoolam for 46 years. 

On 5 January 1984, just after the new year celebrations, Lady Sushil died at the age of 61 at State House, Le Réduit and was given a state funeral.

Memorial
In memory of Lady Sushil Ramgoolam, various public places such as a college in Triolet, a social welfare complex in Bel Air Rivière Sèche, a recreational center in Pointe Aux Piments and a Medi-Clinic in Flacq bear the name of Lady Sushil Ramgoolam, among others.

See also
 First Lady of Mauritius
 Spouse of the prime minister of Mauritius
 Veena Ramgoolam
 Sir Seewoosagur Ramgoolam
 Navin Ramgoolam

References

Mauritian people of Indian descent
Spouses of prime ministers of Mauritius
First ladies and gentlemen of Mauritius
People from Savanne District
1922 births
1984 deaths
Wives of knights